There are over 20,000 Grade II* listed buildings in England. This page is a list of these buildings in the district of Scarborough in North Yorkshire.

Scarborough

|}

Notes

External links

 
Lists of Grade II* listed buildings in North Yorkshire
Borough of Scarborough